This is a list of electoral division results for the Australian 2007 federal election in the state of Tasmania.

Overall results

Results by division

Bass

Braddon

Denison

Franklin

Lyons

See also 

 Results of the 2007 Australian federal election (House of Representatives)
 Post-election pendulum for the 2007 Australian federal election
 Members of the Australian House of Representatives, 2007–2010

References 

Tasmania 2007